The Marvel Fact Files are a series of encyclopedic guides which detail the fictional universe featured in Marvel Comics publications. The magazine series is published in the UK by Eaglemoss Publications starting in 2013.

The magazines are published in a similar way to the Master Edition of the Official Handbook of the Marvel Universe: Each issue is a shrink-wrapped pack of double-sided loose-leaf pages (only glued together for transport). A three-ring vinyl binder was also released for the pages to be inserted into and is regularly distributed with the magazine.

Subscribers receive three other pieces of memorabilia and also special issues throughout the year with extra figures like the mega-specials of The Classic Marvel Figurine Collection. 
The online service, based in the UK, prohibits the items to be sold directly to American buyers, however the magazines can be obtained through several comic book speciality stores in the United States and in Europe. The collection was announced to be ending with issue 100 at first but was prolonged to issue 150 in 2015 and to issue 200 in 2016. Eaglemoss have added 50 more issue for 2017, taking the issue total to 250 and making it the most comprehensive Encyclopedia of Marvel with 7500 pages.

The Marvel Fact Files where translated into Italian and Spanish, the latter received a 70 issues hard cover edition. In Brazil, only the specials that featured figurines were published.

Bibliography 
Original Series #1 - #250 (Eaglemoss Publications, 2013 - 2016)
² double-sheet / ³ triple-sheet

Specials (featuring figurines)

Credits
Editors in order of stewardship: John Tomlinson, Sven Wilson, Matt McAllister
 
Art Editors: Colin Williams, Dan Rachael

See also
 List of Marvel Comics characters
 List of Marvel Comics teams and organizations
 List of Marvel Comics publications
 The Classic Marvel Figurine Collection
 Official Handbook of the Marvel Universe

References

External links
 Marvel Fact Files on EagleMoss

Marvel Comics encyclopedias
Magazines about comics